Mostafizur Rahman Fizar (born 29 November 1953) is a Bangladeshi politician who was the minister for Primary and Mass Education and a member of parliament of Bangladesh since 1986. He formerly served as the State Minister for the Ministry of Environment and Forest and later took over the Ministry of Land as State Minister, from 31 July 2009 to 21 November 2013.

Early life 
Fizar was born at Phulbari Upazila in Dinajpur District on 29 November 1953. He finished his SSC from the  Sujapur High School  and HSC in 1970 from Phulbari College. He fought in Sector-7 of the Bangladesh Liberation war in 1971. He completed his bachelor's and master's in law from Rajshahi University in 1977 and 1986 respectively.

Career
In 1979, Fizar was the organizing secretary of Phulbari Thana Awami League. From 1980 to 1992, he was Organizing Secretary of Dinajpur District Awami League. From 1992 to 2012, he was elected the General Secretary of Dinajpur District Awami League. In 2013, he was elected President of the Dinajpur District Awami League.

Fizar was elected member of Jatiya Sangsad six consecutive times since 1986 from Dinajpur-5. In the seventh parliament, he served as the chairman of the standing committee on disaster management and relief ministry. He also served as a member of the parliamentary standing committee on public accounts and on communication ministry. He was appointed the State Minister of Environment and Forest. From 31 July 2009 to 21 November 2013, he was the state minister of land.

References

Living people
1953 births
People from Dinajpur District, Bangladesh
University of Rajshahi alumni
Awami League politicians
Recipients of the Bir Bikrom
State Ministers of Land
Primary and Mass Education ministers of Bangladesh
State Ministers of Environment and Forests (Bangladesh)
3rd Jatiya Sangsad members
5th Jatiya Sangsad members
7th Jatiya Sangsad members
8th Jatiya Sangsad members
9th Jatiya Sangsad members
10th Jatiya Sangsad members
11th Jatiya Sangsad members